Tohickon may refer to:

 Tohickon Creek
 Tohickon Middle School
 Tohickon, Pennsylvania
 Tohickon State Park